Couture is a surname. Notable people with the surname include:

Dani Couture (born 1978), Canadian writer
Gerry Couture (1925–1994), Canadian hockey player
Guillaume Couture (1617/18–1701), lay missionary, diplomat and militia captain in New France
Léonie Couture (born 1951), Canadian feminist and charity founder
Logan Couture (born 1989), Canadian hockey player
Maurice Couture (1926-2018), former Roman Catholic Archbishop of Québec
Randy Couture (born 1963), retired American mixed martial arts fighter
Rosario Couture (1905–1986), Canadian hockey player
Ryan Couture (born 1982), American mixed martial arts fighter and son of Randy Couture
Thomas Couture (1815–1879), French history painter
 Jean-Guy Couture (1929-2022), canadian catholic priest

See also
Martin Couture-Rouleau (died 2014) aka Ahmad LeConverti, radicalized Canadian Islamist convert

French-language surnames